Chamai Maru Chet Bridge is a historic bridge in Bangkok located on Phitsanulok Road, Suan Chitlada Sudditrict, Dusit District in the area of Government House near Rajavinit Mathayom School, Nang Loeng Racecourse, Rajamangala University of Technology Phra Nakhon: Nang Loeng Campus and Wat Benchamabophit. At the end of the bridge on Rajavinit Mathayom School side is four-way intersection that is the meeting point of Rama V and Phitsanulok Roads, called Phanitchayakan Intersection (แยกพาณิชยการ).

In the year 1901, Princess Valaya Alongkorn  was 15 years old and entered the 17th year, compared to her older brothers, who had died, the two are Prince Maha Vajirunhis and Prince Sommatiwongse Varodaya. She then built a bridge to be a charity devoted to both of her older brothers who had died earlier with age 17.

When it was completed, King Chulalongkorn (Rama V) gave the official name that "Chamai Maru Chet" means that "older brothers who was a both deity" (Chamai is Khmer word means "both" or "twice", and Maru Chet is two Thai words that mean "deceased brother" or "brother who was a deity"). The opening ceremony was held on January 16, 1902.

References

Bridges in Bangkok
Bridges completed in 1902
Dusit district
Registered ancient monuments in Bangkok